Benny Tabak (born 7 June 1956) is an Israeli coach and former footballer who is now coaching Hapoel Herzliya.

Personal life
His father was Israeli Olympic runner David Tabak. He is Jewish.

References

Living people
1957 births
Israeli Jews
Israeli footballers
Footballers from Ness Ziona
Israel international footballers
Maccabi Tel Aviv F.C. players
Maccabi Yavne F.C. players
Maccabi Petah Tikva F.C. players
Hapoel Kfar Saba F.C. players
Maccabi Jaffa F.C. players
Israeli football managers
Hapoel Be'er Sheva F.C. managers
Hapoel Ironi Kiryat Shmona F.C. managers
Hapoel Nir Ramat HaSharon F.C. managers
Hapoel Herzliya F.C. managers
Israeli Premier League managers
Expatriate soccer players in the United States
Israeli expatriate sportspeople in the United States
Israeli people of Romanian-Jewish descent
Association football forwards
Israeli Football Hall of Fame inductees